HMS Madagascar was a 38-gun  originally of the French Navy. Her French name had been Néréide, and she had been built to a design by François Pestel.

The British captured Néréide during the action of 20 May 1811, and commissioned her into the Royal Navy as HMS Madagascar.

She took part in the Peninsular War against France, and the War of 1812 with the United States.

Shortly thereafter, Captain Bentinck Cavendish Doyle of Lightning transferred to take command of Madagascar.

In June 1814, Madagascar served in a flotilla under the command of Admiral Lord Cochrane, and carried General William Miller and his troops from Bordeaux to the Chesapeake Bay to reinforce General Ross in the War of 1812.1

Notes and citations
Notes

Citations

References
 Crawford, Michael J. (Ed) (2002). The Naval War of 1812: A Documentary History, Vol. 3. Washington: United States Department of Defense. 

 address to the Royal Artillery Historical Society 2003 Autumn Meeting by Mr Thomas Hudson, OBE, MA, 17 September 2003, at Woolwich, England.
 HMS Madagascar, Naval database

External links
 

Frigates of the Royal Navy
1809 ships
Captured ships
Ships built in France
War of 1812 ships of the United Kingdom
Frigates of the French Navy